Montecastrilli is a comune (municipality) in the Province of Terni in the Italian region of Umbria, located about 50 km south of Perugia and about 15 km northwest of Terni.

Main sights
Among the churches in the town are:
San Nicolò - 10th or 11th-century church
Santa Maria di Ciciliano- 11th-century church
San Lorenzo in Nifili - 11th-century
Santa Maria Assunta - 11th to 12th-century parish church of Quadrelli
San Bartolomeo - 12th-century parish church of Casteltodino
Monastery of Santa Chiara (1649) 
Santa Rosario  - 17th-century baroque church in Quadrelli

References

External links
 Official website

Cities and towns in Umbria